Warwick Leslie Smith AO (born 13 May 1954) is an Australian politician, and was a Liberal member of the Australian House of Representatives from December 1984 to March 1993 and again from March 1996 to October 1998, representing the Division of Bass, Tasmania.

Smith attended the Launceston Church Grammar School and the Australian National University, where he studied law, history and political science. He later graduated from the University of Tasmania with a Bachelor of Laws in 1979. He then worked as a solicitor in Tasmania. Smith was elected to Parliament in 1984 and later held two ministerships in John Howard's government: Minister for Sport, Territories and Local Government from March 1996 to October 1997, and then Minister for Family Services until October 1998.

Smith lost his seat in the 1998 general election to ALP candidate Michelle O'Byrne. He has since held several management positions in the corporate sector. He has worked as an executive director of Macquarie Bank, head of the Australia China Business Council, and is currently the chairman of ANZ New South Wales and chairman of the advisory board of Australian Equity Group, an investment company owned by Kerry Stokes.

Between July 2010 to April 2012, Smith was Chairman of the Australian Sports Commission.

References

External links
Parliament of Australia biography

1954 births
Living people
Liberal Party of Australia members of the Parliament of Australia
Members of the Australian House of Representatives for Bass
Members of the Australian House of Representatives
Australian National University alumni
Officers of the Order of Australia
20th-century Australian politicians
Government ministers of Australia